Alice Schlesinger (born May 26, 1988) is an Israeli-British retired judoka and sambo competitor. Born in Israel, she competed for that country until 2014, but following a dispute with the national federation she has started competing for Great Britain, of whom she is a citizen through her English-born mother.

Judo World Championship bronze medalist (2009), bronze medalist of Judo European Championships (2008, 2009, 2012), world champion in Sambo (2013, 2014), world champion in Kurash (2013).

Early life
Schlesinger  was born and raised in Herzliya, Israel. Her father is an Israeli Jew, whereas her mother is English-born and a convert to Judaism. Her brother introduced her to the sport as a child and her parents took her to competitions on weekends.
She is trained by her Israeli boyfriend/coach, Pavel Musin.

Judo career

For Israel
Schlesinger has won two Israel national championships (including in 2004, at U57).  She also won Continental gold medals in the U17, U20, and U23 competitions.

In July 2004, she won the European U17 Judo Championships, at U57, in Rotterdam, Netherlands. In October 2004, she won a bronze medal at the U20 World Judo Championships, at U57, in Budapest, Hungary.

In July 2005, at the age of 17, Schlesinger competed in the 2005 Maccabiah Games, winning the gold medal by defeating the world champion and former Israeli Daniela Krukower.  In October 2005, she won a bronze medal at the European U20 Judo Championships, at U63, in Zagreb, Croatia.

In September 2006, she won a silver medal at the European U20 Judo Championships, at U63, in Tallinn, Estonia.  Despite the medal, she said:  "I had a mediocre tournament. I made mistakes in the final. I plan to go over those mistakes with my coach and correct what needs to be corrected".

In October 2007, she won the European U20 Judo Championship, at U63, in Prague, Czech Republic.

She competed at the age of 20 on behalf of Israel at the 2008 Summer Olympics in Beijing, China, as a half-middleweight at U63, and placed 13th, losing to French silver medalist Lucie Décosse.	

In April 2008 and April 2009, she won bronze medals at the 2008 European Judo Championships and 2009 European Judo Championships, at U63, in Lisbon, Portugal, and Tbilisi, Georgia.

In August 2009, she won a bronze medal in the 2009 World Judo Championships, at U63, in Rotterdam.  In November 2009 she won the European U23 Judo Championship, at U63, in Antalya, Turkey.  The Olympic Committee of Israel selected her as its 2009 co-Athlete of the Year.

In August 2011, Schlesinger was ranked 6th in the world in her weight class.  In September 2011, she won a silver medal at a Grand Prix in Düsseldorf, Germany, at U63.  She lost only one match, in the finals by judges' decision to Yoshie Ueno of Japan, the world champion for the prior two years, after beating four opponents, including European champion Elisabeth Willeboordse of the Netherlands.

In July 2012 Schlesinger reached the quarter finals of the 2012 Summer Olympics but lost to Urska Zolnir of Slovenia.

Following the London Olympics, Schlesinger and the Israel Judo Association (IJA) became embroiled in a much publicized conflict. Schlesinger says that the IJA ordered her to put on weight so she could move up a weight class, to make room for Yarden Gerbi in the under-63 kg class. Her personal trainer's salary was also cut by the IJA. The IJA denies she was asked to change weight classes, and says it moved to a different, team-oriented coaching program which required Schlesinger to change coaches. As a result of the conflict, Schlesinger decided to stop competing for the Israeli national team, and to compete instead for Great Britain.

For Great Britain
In December 2014 the International Judo Federation confirmed that former Israeli Olympian Alice Schlesinger will now compete for Great Britain.

Since then, her accomplishments include a silver medal at the European Judo Open in Sofia, Bulgaria, a gold medal at the 2015 Grand Prix in Düsseldorf, and a silver medal at the European Women's Judo Open in Prague.

At the 2016 Olympics, she beat Bak Ji-yun in the first round before losing to Anicka van Emden in the second round.

At the April 2017 European Championships in Warsaw, Poland, she won a bronze medal in the -63 kg.

In May 2019, Schlesinger was selected to compete at the 2019 European Games in Minsk, Belarus.

Medals
Sources:

See also
Sports in Israel
List of select Jewish judokas

References

External links

 
 
 
 
 We support Alice Schlesinger Group (Facebook)
 For Alice Schlesinger

1988 births
Living people
Israeli female judoka
Israeli Jews
British Jews
English female judoka
Israeli people of British descent
Olympic judoka of Israel
Olympic judoka of Great Britain
Judoka at the 2008 Summer Olympics
Judoka at the 2012 Summer Olympics
Judoka at the 2016 Summer Olympics
Jewish Israeli sportspeople
Jewish martial artists
People from Herzliya
Maccabiah Games medalists in judo
Maccabiah Games gold medalists for Israel
Competitors at the 2005 Maccabiah Games
English people of Israeli descent
Judoka at the 2015 European Games
Judoka at the 2019 European Games
European Games medalists in judo
European Games silver medalists for Great Britain
Universiade gold medalists for Israel
Medalists at the 2013 Summer Universiade